This is a list of mayors of Istanbul, Turkey. This covers the Ottoman Empire to the modern day  Republic of Turkiye; the name of the city in English is Constantinople during the Ottoman period and in the Republican era until  1930.

Ottoman Empire

During 1453–1858
In the Ottoman Empire, the duty of municipal government was the responsibility of "Şehremini" (Şehir: City and Emin: Trustable Person) and local religious judges called "Kadı"

The first mayor of Ottoman Constantinople after the conquest on May 29, 1453 was Hızırbey Çelebi. Until 1858, the capital of the Ottoman Empire was governed by a total of 422 kadis.

Tanzimat period (1858–1876)
The idea to establish a municipality organization in a modern way was first discussed in 1854 during the Crimean War when diplomats and journalists of allied nations came to Constantinople. Later, the parliament accepted a law for the establishment of the office of a mayor (Turkish: Şehremini) and a city council.

Salih Paşa received the first title of Şehremini on July 13, 1858, and governed until November 4, 1858. During the Tanzimat period, 18 mayors took office.

First constitutional monarchy (1876–1908)
In 1876, as First constitutional monarchy was proclaimed, Kadri Paşa was the mayor of Constantinople. During this period 10 mayors governed Constantinople.

Second constitutional monarchy (1908–1923)
During the reign of Young Turks between 1908–1918 and until the foundation of the republic, 23 mayors served in the capital.

Republic of Turkey

Governors as mayors (1923–1960)
After the proclamation of the republic on October 29, 1923, the governor of the city was charged with the duties as deputy mayor. With the municipality act of April 3, 1930, the title of mayor was abandoned and the governor of Istanbul province took over the duties of the mayor. The two separate councils of the province and the municipality were unified. The two councils were reestablished on March 1, 1957.

 1  Haydar Yuluğ (April 15, 1923 – June 8, 1924)
 2  Emin Erkul (June 8, 1924 – October 12, 1928)
 3  Muhittin Üstündağ (October 14, 1928 – December 4, 1938)
 4  Lütfi Kırdar (December 8, 1938 – October 16, 1949)
 5  Fahrettin Kerim Gökay (October 24, 1949 – October 26, 1957)
 6  Kemal Hadımlı (July 12, 1957 – October 5, 1957) (deputy)
 7  Mümtaz Tarhan (November 29, 1957 – May 11, 1958)
 8  Ethem Yetkiner (May 14, 1958 – December 24, 1958)
 9  Kemal Aygün (December 25, 1958 – May 27, 1960)

Mayors during the military rule (1960–1963)
After the coup d'état on May 27, 1960, the military appointed mayors until 1963.

 10  General Refik Tulga (May 27, 1960 – June 14, 1960)
 11  General Şefik Erensü (June 14, 1960 – September 24, 1960)
 12  General Refik Tulga (September 24, 1960 – February 26, 1962)
 13  Turan Ertuğ (February 27, 1962 – March 16, 1962)
 14  Kadri İlkay (March 17, 1962 – December 30, 1963) (deputy)
 15  Kamuran Görgün (June 8, 1962 – June 22, 1962)
 16  Niyazi Akı (January 31, 1963 – February 28, 1963) (deputy)
 17  Necdet Uğur (February 23, 1963 – December 9, 1963)

Elected mayors of Istanbul Municipality (1963–1980)
The municipality act of July 27, 1963, enabled the election of the mayor. The polls held on November 17, 1963, were the first regional elections to elect the mayor.

 18  Haşim İşcan (December 10, 1963 – March 11, 1968) (CHP)
 19  Faruk Ilgaz (March 12, 1968 – June 6, 1968) (AP) (deputy)
 20  Fahri Atabey (June 8, 1968 – December 9, 1973) (AP)
 21  Ahmet İsvan (December 14, 1973 – December 11, 1977) (CHP)
 22  Aytekin Kotil (December 14, 1977 – September 12, 1980) (CHP)

Mayors during the military rule (1980–1984)
After the coup d'état on September 12, 1980, the military appointed mayors until 1984.

With the act of December 4, 1981, the municipality of some big cities in Turkey was reorganized to meet the changed requirements.

 23  General İsmail Hakki Akansel (September 12, 1980 – August 30, 1981)
 24  General Ecmel Kutay (August 30, 1981 – March 24, 1982)
 25  Abdullah Tırtıl (March 24, 1982 – March 26, 1984) (appointed)

Elected mayors of Istanbul Metropolitan Municipality (1984–present)
On March 8, 1984, the metropolitan municipality act was put into force and on March 23 the municipality of Greater Istanbul was established.

See also 
 List of mayors of Ankara

References 

 
Istanbul
Istanbul-related lists